Hunasamaranahalli is a census town in Bangalore District in the Indian state of Karnataka.

Demographics 
 India census, Hunasamaranahalli had a population of 7,384. Males constitute 56% of the population and females 44%. Hunasamaranahalli has an average literacy rate of 75%, higher than the national average of 59.5%: male literacy is 79%, and female literacy is 69%. In Hunasamaranahalli, 13% of the population is under 6 years of age.

Economy
The head office of Star Air is on the property of the Sindhu Logistic Park in Hunasamaranahalli.

References 

Cities and towns in Bangalore Rural district